Holladay is a surname.  People with it include the following:

Alexander Holladay (1811–1877), American politician and lawyer
Alexander Q. Holladay (1839–1909), American politician and lawyer
Ben Holladay (1819–1887), American transportation businessman
John Holladay (1798–1862), American pioneer
Terry Holladay (born 1955), American tennis player
Wilhelmina Holladay (1922–2021), American art collector and patron

Surnames